Adilson Dias Batista (born 16 March 1968) is a Brazilian professional football coach and former player. He is the current head coach of Botafogo-SP.

His professional playing career as a centre-back spanned 13 years, during which he was mainly associated with Cruzeiro and Grêmio. Adilson also represented the Brazil national team in four occasions.

Playing career
Born in Adrianópolis, Paraná, he was known as Adilson during his playing days, and finished his formation with Atlético Paranaense. Promoted to the first-team in 1987 by head coach Levir Culpi, he was a regular starter before moving to Cruzeiro in 1989.

Adilson subsequently represented Internacional, Atlético Mineiro and Grêmio before moving abroad in 1997 and joining Júbilo Iwata. He returned to his home country in 2000, signing for Corinthians and retiring with the club shortly after.

Coaching career
Batista started his coaching career with Mogi Mirim in 2001. In the following season, he was in charge of América-RN and Avaí.

On 27 May 2003, Batista was named head coach of Paraná in the Série A, but moved to fellow league team Grêmio on 22 August. On 4 June 2004, he was dismissed by the latter.

Batista subsequently took over Paysandu before being appointed head coach of Sport in 2005. Late in the year he was at the helm of Figueirense, but returned to Japan and Júbilo Iwata in 2006.

On 6 December 2007, Batista was appointed head coach of another club he represented as a player, Cruzeiro. With the club he reached the finals of the 2009 Copa Libertadores, losing it to Estudiantes. On 3 June 2010, he announced his resignation.

On 24 July 2010, Batista replaced Mano Menezes at the helm of Corinthians. On 10 October, after five winless matches, he stepped down.

On 8 November 2010, Batista was announced as the new Santos head coach for the 2011 season. He was sacked the following 27 February, as the club was struggling in the 2011 Copa Libertadores.

On 5 April 2011, Batista returned to Atlético Paranaense, now as head coach. He resigned on 25 June, and took over São Paulo on 16 July; he was relieved from his duties on 16 October.

On 4 April 2012, Batista was named Atlético Goianiense head coach, being sacked on 30 May despite suffering only one defeat during his tenure. On 8 November, he returned to Figueirense.

On 29 October 2013, Batista was appointed in charge of Vasco da Gama, being sacked the following 30 August. In June 2015, after nearly one year unemployed, he took over Joinville, being relieved from his duties on 26 July.

On 24 July 2018, after nearly three years of inactivity, Batista was named head coach of América Mineiro, being relieved from his duties on 10 November after ten winless matches. On 2 October of the following year, he was appointed in charge of Ceará also in the top tier.

On 28 November 2019, Batista was sacked by Ceará, and returned to Cruzeiro the following day, replacing Abel Braga. He was dismissed by the latter on 15 March 2020, after only one win in his last nine matches at the club.

On 6 March 2022, after nearly two years without coaching, Batista took over Londrina. He left after the season ended, and was named in charge of fellow second division side Botafogo-SP on 23 February 2023.

Career statistics

Club

International

Coaching statistics

Honours

Player
Atlético Paranaense
Campeonato Paranaense: 1988

Cruzeiro
Campeonato Mineiro: 1990, 1992
Supercopa Libertadores: 1991, 1992

Grêmio
Campeonato Gaúcho: 1995,1996
Copa Libertadores: 1995
Recopa Sudamericana: 1996

Júbilo Iwata
Asian Super Cup: 1998, 1999
J1 League: 1997, 1999
J.League Cup: 1998

Corinthians
FIFA Club World Cup: 2000

Coach
América-RN
Campeonato Potiguar: 2002

Figueirense
Campeonato Catarinense: 2006

Cruzeiro
Campeonato Mineiro: 2008, 2009

Individual
Bola de Prata: 1990

References

External links
 
 
 
 
 

1968 births
Living people
Brazilian footballers
Brazilian football managers
Brazilian expatriate footballers
Expatriate footballers in Japan
Campeonato Brasileiro Série A players
J1 League players
Expatriate football managers in Japan
Campeonato Brasileiro Série A managers
Campeonato Brasileiro Série B managers
Campeonato Brasileiro Série C managers
J1 League managers
Club Athletico Paranaense players
Cruzeiro Esporte Clube players
Sport Club Internacional players
Clube Atlético Mineiro players
Grêmio Foot-Ball Porto Alegrense players
Júbilo Iwata players
Sport Club Corinthians Paulista players
Copa Libertadores-winning players
Brazil international footballers
Mogi Mirim Esporte Clube managers
América Futebol Clube (RN) managers
Avaí FC managers
Paraná Clube managers
Grêmio Foot-Ball Porto Alegrense managers
Paysandu Sport Club managers
Sport Club do Recife managers
Figueirense FC managers
Júbilo Iwata managers
Cruzeiro Esporte Clube managers
Sport Club Corinthians Paulista managers
Santos FC managers
Club Athletico Paranaense managers
São Paulo FC managers
Atlético Clube Goianiense managers
CR Vasco da Gama managers
Joinville Esporte Clube managers
América Futebol Clube (MG) managers
Ceará Sporting Club managers
Londrina Esporte Clube managers
Botafogo Futebol Clube (SP) managers
Association football defenders